Lowell Tanner Burns (born December 28, 1998) is an American professional baseball pitcher in the Cleveland Guardians organization. He was selected 36th overall by the Indians in the 2020 Major League Baseball draft.

Early life & amateur career
Burns grew up in Decatur, Alabama and attended Decatur High School, where he played baseball starting in eighth grade. As a junior, Burns hit .472 with 13 home runs and 60 RBIs and went 5–2 with two saves, a 1.11 ERA and 80 strikeouts. As a senior, Burns went 10–1 with a 0.88 ERA and 116 strikeouts while batting .467 with 16 homers, 10 doubles, four triples and 46 RBIs and was named Alabama Mr. Baseball, the Alabama Gatorade Player of the Year and the National Player of the Year by the Collegiate Baseball Newspaper. Burns was selected in the 37th round of the 2017 Major League Baseball draft by the New York Yankees but did not sign.

As a true freshman at Auburn University, Burns made 17 starts, posting a 7–4 record with a 3.01 ERA and 77 strikeouts in  innings pitched and was named to the Southeastern Conference (SEC) All-Freshman team and was named a Freshman All-American by Baseball America, Collegiate Baseball, D1 Baseball and Perfect Game/Rawlings. He was named preseason first team All-SEC going into his sophomore season. He went 4–4 with a 2.82 ERA and 101 strikeouts in 15 starts (while battling shoulder issues that cause him to miss a start in Auburn's CWS appearance) and was named a third team all-American by Perfect Game. In 2018, he was selected for United States collegiate national baseball team.

Burns entered his junior season healthy, and on the watchlist for the Golden Spikes Award. He was a preseason All-American selection and was projected to be a first round selection in the 2020 Major League Baseball draft.

Professional career
Burns was selected by the Cleveland Indians with the 36th overall selection of the draft. He signed with the Indians on July 17, 2020, for a $1.6MM bonus. He did not play a minor league game in 2020 due to the cancellation of the minor league season caused by the COVID-19 pandemic.

Burns made his professional debut in 2021 with the Lake County Captains of the High-A Central, starting 18 games and going 2-5 with a 3.57 ERA and 91 strikeouts over  innings.

References

External links

Auburn Tigers bio

1998 births
Living people
Auburn Tigers baseball players
Baseball pitchers
Baseball players from Alabama
Sportspeople from Decatur, Alabama
United States national baseball team players
Lake County Captains players
Akron RubberDucks players